Al-Turantaiyah Madrasa is a madrasah complex in Aleppo, Syria. It was built between 1241-51 by the Aleppine historian Ibn al-Udaym.

Located outside the city walls to the east of Bab al-Nairab gate, the madrasah was first known as al-Kamaliyah al-Udaymiyah. Later on, during the 14th century it was renamed after Afif ad-Din al-Turantay al-Mansuri the ruler of Damascus and the representative of the Mamluk sultan Al Mansur Qalawun.

See also
 Al-Firdaws Madrasa
 Al-Sultaniyah Madrasa
 Al-Uthmaniyah Madrasa
 Al-Zahiriyah Madrasa
 Ancient City of Aleppo
 Khusruwiyah Mosque

References

Mamluk architecture in Syria
Madrasas in Aleppo
Religious buildings and structures completed in 1251